The 1971 Rothmans International Vancouver, also known as the Vancouver WCT, was a men's professional tennis tournament that was part of the 1971 World Championship Tennis circuit. It was held on indoor carpet courts at the PNE Agrodome in Vancouver, British Columbia in Canada. It was the second edition of the tournament and was held from 3 October through 11 October 1971. Fourth-seeded Ken Rosewall won the singles title and earned $10,000 first-prize money.

Finals

Singles

 Ken Rosewall defeated  Tom Okker 6–2, 6–2, 6–4
 It was Rosewall's 7th singles title of the year and the 20th of his career in the Open Era.

Doubles

 Roy Emerson /  Rod Laver defeated  John Alexander /  Phil Dent 5–7, 6–7, 6–0, 7–5, 7–6

References

Vancouver WCT Tournament
Tennis in Canada
1971 in Canadian tennis